Wayne Hogg (born 24 September 1980) is a Scottish international indoor and lawn bowler.

Bowls career
In 2008 he won the gold medal in the triples at the 2008 World Outdoor Bowls Championship in Christchurch along with David Peacock and Willie Wood.

He then won the 2008 Scottish National Bowls Championships singles title qualifying for the 2009 World Singles Champion of Champions event, where he won the silver medal losing to Brett Wilkie of Australia in the final.

In addition to his singles title he also won the Scottish National Bowls Championships triples title in 2013.

References

1980 births
Living people
Scottish male bowls players
Scottish sportsmen
Bowls World Champions